Bhola Prasad (born 3 February 1987) is a retired Indian professional footballer who played as a midfielder. During his career, he played professionally for East Bengal, Tollygunge Agragami, Mahindra United, ONGC, HAL, and Rangdajied United.

Club career
Prasad began his career with the Tata Football Academy before moving to National Football League side East Bengal in 2004. After spending a season with East Bengal, Prasad moved to Tollygunge Agragami where he played for the club in both the National Football League and the Calcutta Football League. While with Tollygunge Agragami, Prasad was selected for the under-21 West Bengal side that participated in the Dutta Ray Trophy in 2006. After spending a season with Tollygunge, Prasad moved again to Mahindra United in Mumbai. He stayed with the club until May 2010, when the club dissolved after the 2009–10 season.

After the season ended, Prasad joined another local Mumbai side, ONGC, who were promoted from the I-League 2nd Division. After spending just one season with the club as they were relegated, Prasad moved to HAL in Bangalore.

Prasad spent a short time with HAL before moving again to Rangdajied United in the I-League 2nd Division. In 2013, Prasad helped Rangdajied earn promotion from the 2nd Division to the I-League. He made his I-League debut with Rangdajied United on 20 October 2013 against Mohammedan as they were defeated 3–0. At the end of the season, despite Rangdajied finishing two spots above last place, the club were expelled from the I-League.

After leaving Rangdajied United, Prasad rejoined ONGC and participated in local tournaments for the club.

International career
Prasad was part of the India under-17 side which participated in the 2002 AFC U-17 Championship.

Professional statistics

Honours
Rangdajied United
I-League 2nd Division: 2013

References

1987 births
Living people
Indian footballers
Association football midfielders
Tata Football Academy players
East Bengal Club players
Tollygunge Agragami FC players
Mahindra United FC players
ONGC FC players
Hindustan Aeronautics Limited S.C. players
Rangdajied United F.C. players
National Football League (India) players
Calcutta Football League players
I-League players
I-League 2nd Division players
India youth international footballers
Footballers from Goa